The Wolf Dog is a 1933 American Pre-Code Mascot film serial directed by Colbert Clark and Harry L. Fraser and starring Frankie Darro and Rin Tin Tin, Jr. The plot concerns a young boy becoming the heir to a fortune and a villain attempting to take it from him. The boy's canine pet, Rin Tin Tin Jr., is the star of the film, protecting his master from a succession of murder attempts.

This was Rin Tin Tin Jr.'s first serial outing, having replaced the original Rin Tin Tin who died in 1932. He also starred in two other serials, The Law of the Wild (1934) and The Adventures of Rex and Rinty (1935).

Plot
Youngster Frank Courtney discovers that he has inherited control of a Los Angeles shipping line. The current president, Norman Bryan, does not want to lose his position and conspires to have the boy killed. Rin Tin Tin Jr., the Wonder Dog, protects the boy from Bryan's murderous plots throughout the serial's running time.

Cast
 Frankie Darro as Frank Courtney, heir to a shipping line
 Rin Tin Tin, Jr. as Pal, Frank's dog
 Boots Mallory as Irene Blane, who is really Frank's cousin Irene Courtney
 George J. Lewis as Bob Whitlock, radio operator
 Henry B. Walthall as Jim Courtney
 Hale Hamilton as Norman Bryan, villainous current President of the shipping line
 Fred Kohler as Joe Stevens
 Donald Reed as Swanson
 Gordon De Main as Murphy
 Tom London as Brooks
 Stanley Blystone as Lang
 Max Wagner as Dave Harmon
 Leon Holmes as Napoleon 
 Sarah Padden as Mrs. Stevens
 Dickie Moore as Boy at Airport
 Carroll Nye as Radio Announcer
 Lew Meehan as	Rancher
 Harry Tenbrook as Sailor (uncredited)

Production

Stunts
 Yakima Canutt - the "Ram Rod" (stunt coordinator)
 George Magrill
 Kermit Maynard

Chapter titles

 The Call of the Wilderness
 The Shadow of a Crime
 The Fugitive
 A Dead Man's Hand
 Wolf Pack Law
 The Gates of Mercy
 The Empty Room
 Avenging Fangs
 Wizard of the Wireless
 Accused
 The Broken Record
 Danger Lights
Source:

See also
 List of film serials
 List of film serials by studio

References

External links

Stills at filesofjerryblake.com

1933 films
1933 adventure films
American black-and-white films
1930s English-language films
Films directed by Harry L. Fraser
Mascot Pictures film serials
Films produced by Nat Levine
American adventure films
Rin Tin Tin
1930s American films